Several institutions are named the Centre for Deaf Studies, including: 

Centre for Deaf Studies, Dublin at Trinity College Dublin, Ireland
Centre for Deaf Studies, Bristol at the University of Bristol, England